Farmers' Party may refer to:
Farmers' Party (Greece), a political party in Greece in the 1920s and 1930s
Farmers' Party (Iceland, 1913), a political party in Iceland between 1913 and 1916
Farmers' Party (Iceland, 1933), a political party in Iceland between 1933 and 1942
Farmers' Party (Ireland), an agrarian political party in the Irish Free State between 1922 and 1932
Farmers' Party (Jamaica), a political party in Jamaica
Japan Farmers Party (1926–28), a political party in Japan between 1926 and 1928
Japan Farmers Party (1947–49), a political party in Japan
Farmers' Party (Lithuania), a liberal political party in inter-war Lithuania
Farmers' Party (Netherlands), a Dutch agrarian political party
Luzon Farmers Party (Philippines)

See also
Latvian Farmers' Union
Peasant Party (Taiwan)
Shooters, Fishers and Farmers Party, an Australian party
Agrarian Party (disambiguation)
United Farmers (disambiguation)